Meagan Day is a writer, editor, and activist. She is an editor at Jacobin, where she was previously a staff writer. She is the author of the 2016 book Maximum Sunlight and co-author of the book Bigger than Bernie: How We Go from the Sanders Campaign to Democratic Socialism. Her articles have appeared in The New York Times, The Guardian, Vox, n+1, The Baffler, In These Times, Mother Jones, The Believer, and elsewhere, and she's been interviewed by the Washington Post, the Columbia Journalism Review, and the Harvard Political Review.  She is a member of the Democratic Socialists of America.

Early life and education 
Day was raised in San Antonio, Texas. Day has stated in multiple interviews that she grew up relatively well-off, an experience that she says shaped her eventual political outlook.  Day's father is an “owner and operator of businesses spanning the automotive, real estate, charter jet, hospitality and furniture industries.”

Day received her bachelor's degree at Oberlin College, graduating in 2012. It was while attending Oberlin College that she became a writer and editor at the literary criticism magazine Full Stop. She received her master's degree from Goldsmiths, University of London in 2013, and in the years following contributed to Full Stop, n+1 and The New Inquiry. It was also at this time that Day began to read the magazine Jacobin, and found an interest in journalism and left-wing politics growing.

Writing

Maximum Sunlight (2016) 
In 2016, Day wrote the book Maximum Sunlight which details her experience as she visits Tonopah, Nevada, an isolated, unincorporated town located in the middle of the desert, between Reno and Las Vegas. The work of creative nonfiction consists of short impressionistic vignettes structured around Day's observations and research, and interviews with local residents. The book has photography by Hannah Klein.

Olivia Durif, writing for the LA Review of Books, described Maximum Sunlight as "a long piece of investigative journalism and a short, intimate work of nonfiction". Durif went on to describe Day's writing as "observant and respectful" saying "[Day] never denies her assumptions, but she also doesn't trust them. Her book is propelled by curiosity — about herself as much as others".

Shift toward socialism 
In an interview with Columbia Journalism Review, Day said she first encountered Jacobin magazine while living in Turkey during Gezi Park protests where she "start[ed] to see the importance of class division and of class conflict everywhere, and was finding that left-liberal media was insufficient to explaining the world." The magazine began to influence her political viewpoint, but it wasn't until the 2016 presidential run of Bernie Sanders that she joined the Democratic Socialists of America (DSA), an experience that she described in Jacobin, The Harvard Political Review, and elsewhere as being formative for her.

Political commentary 
In 2017, the year after she joined and became active in DSA, she officially joined Jacobin part-time, and soon became the magazine's first full-time staff writer.

She first received media attention for her writing in Jacobin when she was invited in 2018 to be interviewed on The Michael Brooks Show, which she would later say became the start of a friendship with the host, Michael Brooks. Day began to appear on Michael Brooks's show regularly, along with other podcasts and YouTube shows, to provide left-wing commentary on American politics.

In 2018, Day and Jacobin founder Bhaskar Sunkara were invited to stand in for the New York Times opinion columnist David Leonhardt for one week. This resulted in the publication of five op-eds. The topics included the need for Medicare for All, the importance of labor unions, the need to end cash bail, how to combat the rise of the far right, and the need to overhaul the US constitution. The latter drew criticism from right-wing commentator Rush Limbaugh.

Also in 2018, Day published an article in Vox titled "Democratic socialism, explained by a democratic socialist." The conservative commentator Glenn Beck read from and condemned the article at the 2019 Conservative Political Action Conference.

Day's work was cited in the Trump White House's report on the dangers of the growing American socialist movement.

Day openly supported the nomination of Bernie Sanders during the 2020 Democratic Party presidential primary.  In 2020 Jeremy Cliffe, writing in the New Statesman while writing in support of Joe Biden during his general election campaign, used Day's writing to show how the former Vice President was not "exactly the preferred Democratic presidential candidate of progressives in the US" going on to say she "spoke for many on the left".

Bigger than Bernie (2020) 
In 2020, along with co-author Micah Uetricht, Day published the book Bigger than Bernie: How We Go from the Sanders Campaign to Democratic Socialism. In an interview with the Washington Post co-author Uetricht said they had written the book to speak to a combination of socialists, people who liked Bernie Sanders but didn't consider themselves 'activists', and those "who want to understand what at least one wing of this newly reborn socialist movement in the United States thinks."

Day also mentioned in that interview that the way they approached the book was to ensure it would be useful no matter how the then-ongoing Democratic Party primary turned out, and so when writing about their ideas had "tried to boil it down to basics". Elsewhere Day has also said that her motivation for writing the book was because "forces were amassing on the left that had great potential, but that there was not really a roadmap for what to do with that potential after the Bernie moment was over."

Rick Perlstein, when talking to The Boston Globe, mentioned the book as one of many "popularly oriented books on socialism" also mentioning The Socialist Manifesto by Bhaskar Sunkara, How to Be an Anticapitalist in the 21st Century by Erik Olin Wright, and The Sinking Middle Class by David Roediger.

References

External links

Living people
American social activists
American socialist feminists
Members of the Democratic Socialists of America
Texas socialists
21st-century American journalists
Journalists from San Antonio
American women journalists
American activist journalists
American left-wing activists
Year of birth missing (living people)
Place of birth missing (living people)
21st-century American women